Rainer Borkowsky (born 19 October 1942) is a German rowing coxswain who competed for the United Team of Germany in the 1956 Summer Olympics.

Borkowsky was born in Frankfurt, Germany, in 1942. At the 1956 European Rowing Championships in Bled, Yugoslavia, he won a gold medal in the coxed pair with rowers Karl-Heinrich von Groddeck and Horst Arndt. The same team went to the 1956 Summer Olympics in Melbourne, Australia, where they won the silver medal in this boat class. At the 1957 European Rowing Championships in Duisburg, Germany, they again won a gold medal.

References

1942 births
Living people
Coxswains (rowing)
Olympic rowers of the United Team of Germany
Rowers at the 1956 Summer Olympics
Olympic silver medalists for the United Team of Germany
Olympic medalists in rowing
West German male rowers
Medalists at the 1956 Summer Olympics
European Rowing Championships medalists
Rowers from Frankfurt